Impact analysis may refer to:

Change impact analysis
Economic impact analysis
Regulatory Impact Analysis

See also
Impact assessment
Impact evaluation